François Houtart (7 March 1925 in Brussels – 6 June 2017 in Quito) was a Belgian marxist sociologist and Catholic priest.

Houtart studied philosophy and theology at the seminary of Mechelen (Belgium) and became a priest in 1949. He earned a master's degree in political and social sciences at the Catholic University of Leuven (Belgium). He earned a degree at the International Superior Institute of Urbanism (Brussels, Belgium). He earned a PhD in sociology from the Catholic University of Louvain and served as professor there from 1958 till 1990

His doctoral thesis was based on the sociology of Buddhism in Sri Lanka. He was an author and co-author of numerous publications on socio-religious matters. He served as the chief editor of the International Journal of Sociology of Religion, "Social Compass" for nearly forty years (1960–1999). He also advised the international Catholic journal Concilium which was founded at the Nijmegen University, on the issues of sociology of religion.

He participated as a peritus expert in the sessions of Vatican II (1962–1965) playing a key role in the formation of the introduction of the Gaudium et spes. Over the years, Houtart developed a dialectical approach to the study of world religions.

In the context of the global financial crisis in 2008, Houtart was invited by the UN to address the issues of globalisation of capital in October 2008 by the president of the UN in New York.

In 2009, Houtart was awarded the UNESCO-Madanjeet Singh Prize for the Promotion of Tolerance and Non-Violence "for his lifelong commitment to world peace, intercultural dialogue, human rights and the promotion of tolerance, and in recognition of his outstanding efforts to advance the cause of social justice in the world." He shared the award with Pakistani philanthropist Abdul Sattar Edhi.

In 2009, Houtart signed the Appeal for the removal of Hamas from the EU terror list
 and he was instrumental in the Russell Tribunals against the state of Israel.

Until the scandal about the sexual abuse on a very young boy,  he served as an advisor to CETRI (Centre Tricontinental), a Belgian non-governmental organisation which he founded in 1976. The objective of CETRI is to promote dialogue and corporation between third world social movements and social forces plus encourage resistance and action. Houtart was one of the most active members of the World Social Forum, and was active in the Globalisation and Ethics discourse.

Sexual abuse 
On December 28, 2010, Le Soir reported that Houtart had admitted sexual abuse committed forty years before on the person of a young cousin while he was a guest at the parents' house. The fact was reported to the Adriaenssens Commission by a sister of the victim.

Already at the end of October, when the fact became known, the management of Cetri had requested the resignation of Houtart as director of the NGO Cetri, founded by him. The Director, Bernard Duterme, mentioned the facts committed by Houtart in contradiction with all values of Cetri.

In November, after a confrontation with his accusing niece, he contacted the support committee set up to present him for the Nobel Peace Prize and requested that its action be terminated, and he resigned from various positions.

Organisational Activities 

Center Tricontinental (CETRI)
International Association of Sociology of Religion
World Forum for Alternatives

Publications
The Church and Revolution: from the French Revolution of 1789 to the Paris riots of 1968, from Cuba to Southern Africa, from Vietnam to Latin America, by François Houtart and André Rousseau. Translated by Violet Nevile (1971)
Religions and ideology in Sri Lanka, Colombo, Hansa, (1974)
El campesino como actor, Managua, Ed. Nicarao, (1982)
Religion et modes de production précapitalistes, Bruxelles, editions de l'ULB, (1992)
Sociología de la Religión, Mexico, Plaza y Valdés, (2000)
Mondialisation des Résistances (with Samir Amin), Paris, L'Harmattan, (2002)
Haïti et la culture dans une commune vietnamienne, Paris, Les Indes Savantes, (2004)

Notes

1925 births
2017 deaths
20th-century Belgian Roman Catholic priests
Canons (priests)
Belgian writers in French
Belgian sociologists
Catholic Church sexual abuse scandals in Europe
Religious controversies in Belgium
Writers from Brussels